César Cabrera (born 30 March 1938) is a Paraguayan footballer. He played in eight matches for the Paraguay national football team from 1961 to 1963. He was also part of Paraguay's squad for the 1963 South American Championship.

References

External links
 

1938 births
Living people
People from Piribebuy
Paraguayan footballers
Paraguay international footballers
Association football forwards
Paraguayan expatriate footballers
Paraguayan expatriate sportspeople in Spain
Expatriate footballers in Spain